James Coin Self (June 23, 1915 – December 28, 2000) was a versatile American country music, rockabilly and bluegrass musician and occasional vocalist whose career peaked during the late 1940s–1950s. He played guitar, drums, accordion, and steel guitar. His names are occasionally seen professionally as variously Jimmy and/or Self.

Biography
Selph's first release was in 1947 on the Majestic Records label. He was a member of Curley Williams' band, with whom he recorded several albums. He also appeared with Dottie Dillard. On the Coin label he released titles including "Tom Catin' Around" (1956). He was also a drummer for Hank Thompson and a singer with Milton Estes and the Musical Millers. Selph also recorded on Bullet Records, including "Dream Castles Shared With You" and "Time's A-Wasting, Little Darling". Selph's vocal releases included "That's Why I Worry" and "Say You'll Be Mine". He appeared on and toured with The Grand Ole Opry beginning in the mid-1940s.

In 1955, he was a member of the house band on ABC-TV's Ozark Jubilee (originally known as the Crossroads Boys) with Grady Martin, Bob Moore and Bud Isaccs before he returned to Nashville, Tennessee. As a Nashville and Hollywood session musician, he backed Red Foley, Don Gibson, Webb Pierce, Ray Price, Molly O'Day and The Browns.

Discography

External links 
 Jimmie Selph discography
 Selph at hillbilly-music.com

1921 births
2000 deaths
American country guitarists
American male guitarists
American session musicians
American rockabilly musicians
Capitol Records artists
Coral Records artists
20th-century American guitarists
Guitarists from Texas
Country musicians from Texas
20th-century American male musicians